Priding is a hamlet in the civil parish of Arlingham, in the Stroud district, in the county of Gloucestershire, England.

References

Stroud District
Hamlets in Gloucestershire